Thomas Allom (13 March 1804 – 21 October 1872) was an English architect, artist, and topographical illustrator. He was a founding member of what became the Royal Institute of British Architects (RIBA). He designed many buildings in London, including the Church of St Peter's and parts of the elegant Ladbroke Estate in Notting Hill. He also worked with Sir Charles Barry on numerous projects, most notably the Houses of Parliament, and is also known for his numerous topographical works, such as Constantinople and the Scenery of the Seven Churches of Asia Minor, published in 1838, and China Illustrated, published in 1845.

Architect

He was born in Lambeth, south London, the son of a coachman from Suffolk. In 1819, he was apprenticed to architect Francis Goodwin for whom he worked until 1826. He then studied at the Royal Academy School. His designs for churches shown at exhibitions in 1824 and 1827 aroused considerable interest.

From 1834 to 1843, he worked in partnership with Henry Francis Lockwood in Hull, where they designed a number of Neo-classical buildings, such as Hull Trinity House (1839), extensions to Hull Royal Infirmary (1840) and Great Thornton Street Church (1843); the pair also designed the expansion of the Brownlow Hill workhouse in Liverpool (1842-1843).

Allom later designed many buildings in London, including a workhouse in Marloes Road, Kensington (1847), the Church of Christ in Highbury in 1850, the Church of St Peter's in Notting Hill in 1856, and parts of the Ladbroke Estate in west London. Further afield his works included workhouses at Calne, Wiltshire (1847) and in Liverpool, design of the William Brown Library also in Liverpool, (1857–1860), and the tower of St. Leodegarius Church, Basford near Nottingham (1860). He also worked with Sir Charles Barry on numerous projects, including the Houses of Parliament and the remodelling of Highclere Castle.

Topographical illustrator
However, Allom is chiefly known for his numerous topographical works, which were used to illustrate books on travel. From the 1820s onwards, he travelled extensively through the UK and mainland Europe. In 1832 he published Westmorland, Cumberland, Durham and Northumberland Illustrated from Original Drawings by Thomas Allom (three volumes). In 1834 Allom arrived in Istanbul, Turkey, and produced hundreds of drawings during journeys through Anatolia, Syria and Palestine. The results of this expedition were published in 1838 in Constantinople and the Scenery of the Seven Churches of Asia Minor published in two volumes with text by Robert Walsh. Emily Reeve's Character and Costume in Turkey and Italy, published in London in 1840, was also illustrated with engravings by Allom. John Carne's Syria, the Holy Land, Asia Minor, &c. illustrated, published in London in 1836-1838, was in part illustrated with engravings by Allom. He is also remembered for numerous illustrations of China, published in China Illustrated in 1845. He also provided illustrations for "Family Secrets" by Mrs Ellis (1841) and E W Brayley's "A topographical history of Surrey" (1850).

Final works
Allom, who lived at 1 Barnes Villas (now 80 Lonsdale Road), Barnes, suffered from a heart condition in his later years, and although he only retired in 1870, his artistic and architectural output slowed during the 1860s. In 1865 he was commissioned to design a mausoleum for former MP George Dodd in West Norwood Cemetery (Dodd, who died on 15 December 1864, was one of the Gentlemen of Her Majesty's privy chamber from 1844, and MP for Maidstone from 29 June 1841 to May 1853). In 1868 he designed Holy Trinity Barnes (in south west London), his local church to which he contributed £50 towards the cost of its construction. 

Allom died aged 68 in Barnes, and was buried in Kensal Green Cemetery.

Notable buildings

 St Peter's Notting Hill
 St. Leodegarius Church, Basford

Gallery

References

Attribution

Further reading

Brooks, Diana. Thomas Allom (British Architectural Library, 1998).

External links

Thoms Allom online (ArtCyclopedia), Retrieved 11 July 2010
Thomas Allom's Istanbul, Retrieved 11 July 2010
The entrance of the Golden Horn (watercolour – Christie's), Retrieved 11 July 2010
 Paintings engraved for Fisher's Drawing Room Scrap Books with poetical illustrations by Letitia Elizabeth Landon:
1832, engraved by W Le Petit, 
1832, engraved by W Le Petit, 
1832, engraved by W Le Petit, 
1832, engraved by Joseph Wilson Lowry, 
1833, engraved by E Challis, 
1833, engraved by W LePetit, 
1833, engraved by S Fisher, 
1833, engraved by W LePetit, 
1833, engraved by T Jeavons, 
1833, engraved by E Challis, 
1833, engraved by Joseph Clayton Bentley, 
1833, engraved by J Thomas, 
1834, engraved by Joseph Wilson Lowry, 
1834, engraved by Joseph Clayton Bentley, 
1834, engraved by Joseph Clayton Bentley, 
1834, engraved by W A Le Petit, 
1834, engraved by T Jeavons, 
1835, engraved by W. Floyd, 
1835, engraved by W A Le Petit, 
1835, engraved by Ebenezer Challis, 
1835, engraved by Joseph Wilson Lowry, 
1835, engraved by W A Le Petit, 
1835, engraved by James Thomas, 
1835, engraved by Robert Sands, 
1835, engraved by Ebenezer Challis, 
1836, engraved by M J Starling, 
1836, engraved by J Redaway, 
1836, engraved by J Tingle, 
1836, engraved by James Sands, 
1836, engraved by Joseph Clayton Bentley, 
1837, engraved by Ebenezer Challis, 
1837, engraved by Samuel Lacey, 
1837, engraved by Thomas Higham, 
1837, engraved by James Sands, 
1837, engraved by M J Starling, 
1837, engraved by Joseph Clayton Bentley, 
1838, engraved by R Staines,  with The Tournament by L. E. L.
1838, engraved by J J Hinchliff 
1838, engraved by Samuel Lacey, 
1839, engraved by W Floyd, 
1839, engraved by W Floyd, 
1839, engraved by D Buckle, 
1839, engraved by Samuel Lacey, 
1839, engraved by James Sands, 
1840, engraved by Ebenezer Challis, 
1841, engraved by Thomas Higham, 
 In Fisher's Drawing Room Scrap Book, 1834, as illustration to Letitia Elizabeth Landon's poem :
 Tomb of Ibrahim Padshah, Bejapore, engraved by Thomas Higham.
 In Fisher's Drawing Room Scrap Book, 1834, as illustration to Letitia Elizabeth Landon's poem :
 interior of Exeter Cathedral, engraved by E Challis.
 In Fisher's Drawing Room Scrap Book, 1836 , engraved by Robert Sands.

19th-century English architects
19th-century English painters
English male painters
English watercolourists
English illustrators
Landscape artists
1804 births
1872 deaths
Architects from London
Artists from London
People from Lambeth
Burials at Kensal Green Cemetery
19th-century English male artists